Patung Yesus Kristus is a statue of Jesus Christ located on Mansinam Island, West Papua. The structure stands 29.5 metres tall (15 metres of pedestal and 14.5 metres of statue. The project was inaugurated on August 24, 2014, by President Susilo Bambang Yudhoyono near the end of his last term being the president.

See also
 List of statues of Jesus

References

Western New Guinea
Statues of Jesus
2014 establishments in Indonesia